Baby Shark's Big Show! is an animated children's television series based on the "Baby Shark" brand from the South Korean company Pinkfong. SmartStudy, Pinkfong's parent company, co-produces the show with Nickelodeon Animation Studio from the United States.

In South Korea, Baby Shark's Big Show! debuted on the Educational Broadcasting System (EBS) with a Christmas special on December 25, 2020. From September 2021 onward, the series airs regularly on EBS1 on Wednesdays and Thursdays. In the United States, it premiered on Nickelodeon on December 11, 2020.

Characters

Main characters
 Brooklyn "Baby" Shark (voiced by Kim Seo-yeong in Korean, Kimiko Glenn in English) is a yellow male shark and the main protagonist.
 William (voiced by Yeo Min-jeong in Korean, Luke Youngblood in English) is an orange male pilot fish and Brooklyn's best friend.
 Mommy Shark (voiced by Moon Nam-sook in Korean, Natasha Rothwell in English) is a pink female shark and Brooklyn's mother.
 Daddy Shark (voiced by Jeong Jae-heon in Korean, Eric Edelstein in English) is a blue male shark and Brooklyn's father.
 Grandma Shark (voiced by Kim Eun-ah, Debra Wilson in English) is an orange female shark and Brooklyn's grandmother.
 Grandpa Shark (voiced by Lee Won-chan in Korean, Patrick Warburton in English) is a green male shark and Brooklyn's grandfather.

Supporting characters
 Chucks (voiced by Yoon Eun-seo in Korean, Alex Cazares in English) is a purple male seahorse who is clumsy.
 Ezra (voiced by TBA in Korean, Robbie Daymond in English) is Chucks's seahorse dad.
 Anya (voiced by TBA in Korean, Georgia King in English) is Chucks's fishy stepmom.
 Maddie (voiced by TBA in Korean, Sirena Irwin in English) is Chucks's older fishy stepsister.
 Vola (voiced by Kim Euh-ah in Korean, Kimberly Brooks in English) is a green female octopus who is tomboyish and loves sports. She has two moms.
 Viv (voiced by TBA in Korean, Sherry Cola in English) is Vola's octopus mama.
 Vera (voiced by TBA in Korean, LaNisha Frederick in English) is Vola's other octopus mom.
 Mason (voiced by TBA in Korean, Teddy Walsh in English) is a red male crab who has his pitch 
 Goldie (voiced by Kim Bona in Korean, Cole Escola in English) is a gold female goldfish who is often vain and flamboyant.
 Hank (voiced by Yoon Eun-seo in Korean, Georgie Kidder in English) is a blue male whale and the youngest of Baby's friends.
 Rocky is Hank's pet rock.
 Sherman (voiced by TBA in Korean, Gary Anthony Williams in English) is Hank's whale dad.
 Jozi (voiced by TBA in Korean, Carly Hughes in English) is Hank's whale stepmom.
 Ashley (voiced by TBA in Korean, Cristina Milizia in English) is Hank's younger whale stepsister.
 Splashley (voiced by TBA in Korean, Shelby Young in English) is Hank's other younger whale stepsister.
 Shadow (voiced by Lee Sang Ho in Korean, Cristina Pucelli in English) is a grey male shark and Baby's archrival.
 Bait and Switch (voiced by Rama Vallury and Tara Strong respectively) are Shadow's sidekicks. Bait is a purple tang and Switch is a brown angelfish.
Mariana (voiced by TBA in Korean, Carolina Ravassa in English) is Shadow's mom.
Sledge (voiced by TBA in Korean, Antony Del Rio in English) is Shadow's hammerhead shark cousin.
 Rayna Ray (voiced by Yoon Eun-seo in Korean, Shelby Young in English) is a purple female manta ray who's a news reporter, and William's mother.
 Marty Minnow (voiced by TBA in Korean, Griffin Puatu in English) is a green bespectacled male minnow and the leader of the minnows.
 Mayor Anchovy (voiced by TBA in Korean, John Michael Higgins in English)
 Big Fin (voiced by TBA in Korean, Nolan North in English) is a legendary fishy who lives in the Kelp Woods.
 Teensy Tardigrade (voiced by Cristina Milizia) is Baby Shark's pet tardigrade.
 Party Puddle Dolphin (voiced by Tara Strong)
 Mail Whale (voiced by Fred Tatasciore) is a delivery whale.
 Ernie Urchin (voiced by Kalo Moss in Season 1, Bodhi Friedman in Season 2) is a one-eyed urchin.
 Wallace (voiced by TBA in Korean, Michaela Dietz in English)
 Penny Piranha (voiced by Aria Surrec) is a pink piranha who also turns red when angry.
 Briny (voiced by TBA in Korean, Vasthy Mompoint in English) is a shopkeeping whale.

Antagonists
 Vigo (voiced by TBA in Korean, Andrew Morgado in English) is a villainous squid who is always trying to take over Carnivore Cove.
 Costello (voiced by TBA in Korean, Alexander Polinsky in English) is a fish who is Vigo's assistant and henchman.
 Bentley Barracuda (voiced by TBA in Korean, Jim Rash in English) is a snooty barracuda.
 Package Pirates are a pirate crew who steals packages.
Captain Bubblebeard (voiced by TBA in Korean, Raul Ceballos in English)
First Mate (voiced by TBA in Korean, Nolan North in English)
Bucky (voiced by TBA in Korean, Jeff Bennett in English)

Production
On June 5, 2019, it was announced that the series was in development at Nickelodeon. On June 25, 2020, it was announced that Nickelodeon officially green-lit the series, with a 26-episode order. On November 12, 2020, it was announced that the series would premiere on December 11, 2020.

On July 20, 2021, it was announced that Nickelodeon renewed the series for a 26-episode second season, which premiered on October 18, 2022.

Episodes

Series overview

Season 1 (2020–22)

Season 2 (2022–23)

Shorts
Gary Doodles, Tommy Sica and Whitney Ralls executive produce the shorts, with Ralls doing the stories for each of them. Exit 73 Studios provides the animation to all of them as well.

Reception
Emily Ashby, a reviewer for Common Sense Media, gave the show a 2 (out of 5) star rating. She wrote that "Pinkfong's franchise name carries this show only so far and the lackluster writing and plot can't quite compensate for the rest."

Film
On July 20, 2021, it was announced that Pinkfong and Nickelodeon were developing a Baby Shark movie. In March 2022, it was announced that the film was in development for a 2023 release on Paramount+. On August 4, the film's title, Baby Shark's Big Movie!, and the plot were announced, along with a holiday 2023 release.

References

External links
 
 

2020s American animated television series
2020s American children's television series
2020s Nickelodeon original programming
2020 South Korean television series debuts
2020 American television series debuts
American children's animated adventure television series
American children's animated musical television series
American preschool education television series
South Korean children's animated television series
Animated preschool education television series
American flash animated television series
English-language television shows
Nick Jr. original programming
Animated television series about children
Animated television series about fish